James Henry Robert Innes-Ker, 6th Duke of Roxburghe, KT (12 July 1816 – 23 April 1879) was a Scottish peer.

Early life
Innes-Ker was the only surviving child of the 5th Duke of Roxburghe and the former Harriet Charlewood (–1855).  Before his parents' marriage in 1807, his father was widowed from his marriage to Mary Wray, eldest daughter of Sir John Wray, 12th Baronet. After his father's death in 1823, his mother remarried to Lt. Col. Walter Frederick O'Reilly CB of the Royal African Corps on 14 November 1827.

His maternal grandfather was Benjamin Charlewood of Windlesham in Surrey and his paternal grandparents were Sir Henry Innes, 5th Baronet and Anne (née Grant) Innes.

In 1823, at the age of seven, he inherited his father's titles. He was educated at Eton and Christ Church, Oxford.

Career
In 1840, he was a Knight of the Thistle. He also served as Lieutenant General of the Royal Company of Archers, a governor of the National Bank of Scotland and Lord Lieutenant of Berwickshire from 1873 until his death in 1879.

Personal life
On 29 December 1836, he married Susanna Stephania Dalbiac (1814–1895), the only child of Lt. Gen. Sir James Charles Dalbiac and Susannah (née Dalton) Dalbiac. Together, James and Susanna were the parents of four children:

Lady Susan Harriet Innes-Ker (1837–1909), who married Sir James Grant Suttie, 6th Baronet.
 James Henry Robert Innes-Ker, 7th Duke of Roxburghe (1839–1892), who married Anne Emily Spencer-Churchill, daughter of the John Spencer-Churchill, 7th Duke of Marlborough.
 Lady Charlotte Isabella Innes-Ker (1841–1881), who married George Russell, eldest son of Capt. William Russell RN.
 Lord Charles John Innes-Ker (1842–1919), who married Blanche Peers-Williams, daughter of Col. Thomas Peers Williams, of Craig-y-Don.

Roxburghe died in Genoa on 23 April 1879. After a funeral at Floors Castle, he was interred in the aisle at Bowden. He was succeeded in his titles and estates by his eldest son James. The Dowager Duchess was one of Queen Victoria's staff until the former died in 1895.

References

External links

1816 births
1879 deaths
6
Knights of the Thistle
Lord-Lieutenants of Berwickshire
People educated at Eton College
Peers of the United Kingdom created by Queen Victoria
Members of the Royal Company of Archers